Dobkovice is a municipality and village in Děčín District in the Ústí nad Labem Region of the Czech Republic. It has about 600 inhabitants. It lies on the Elbe river.

Administrative parts
Villages of Poustka and Prosetín are administrative parts of Dobkovice.

References

Villages in Děčín District